The BMW 600 is a four-seater microcar produced by the German automaker BMW from mid-1957 until November 1959. Partially based on the BMW Isetta two-seater, it was BMW's first postwar four-seater economy car.  It was not a sales success, but it began the design process for its more successful successor, the BMW 700.

Concept, design, and engineering

BMW needed to expand its model range, but they did not have the resources to develop an all-new car with an all-new engine. Therefore, it used the Isetta as starting point for a new four seat economy car.

As a result, the 600 used the front suspension and front door of the Isetta. The need to carry four people required a longer frame, a different rear suspension, and a larger engine. A new perimeter frame was designed, using box section side members and straight tube crossmembers. The rear suspension was an independent semi trailing arm design; this was the first time BMW had used this system.

The 600 was powered by the  flat-twin engine from the R67 motorcycle/sidecar combination.  This engine, which delivered  at 4,500 revolutions per minute, was mounted behind the rear wheels. A four-speed manual gearbox was standard, while a Saxomat semi-automatic transmission was available. The 600 had a top speed of approximately 100 km/h.

Access to the rear seats was by a conventional door on the right side of the vehicle.

Reception

The sales figures for the 600 did not meet BMW's expectations. During production from August 1957 to 1959, about 35,000 were built.  This is attributed to competition with more conventional cars, including the Volkswagen Beetle.

Legacy

The 600 played a direct role in the design of its successor, the BMW 700. Wolfgang Denzel, the distributor of BMW cars in Austria, commissioned Giovanni Michelotti to prepare concept sketches based on a lengthened BMW 600 chassis.  Denzel presented the concept, a 2-door coupe with a slanted roof, to BMW's management.  The concept was generally well received, but objections were raised about the limited passenger space.  BMW decided to produce two versions, the coupe, and a 2-door sedan with a taller, longer roof.

Another legacy of the 600 was its independent semi-trailing arm rear suspension.  This was BMW's first use of this suspension system and, with the exception of the BMW M1, it was used on every BMW production automobile until the 1990s. It was eventually supplanted by the "Z-axle" multi-link suspension introduced with the BMW Z1 in 1988.  The last BMW cars with semi-trailing arm suspension were the BMW Compact and the BMW Z3.

Space efficiency
The BMW 600 was noted in magazine and journal articles as an example of space efficient design. It was noted for carrying four people within a shorter length than that of the Mini.

Notes

References

External links

 Motorbase: BMW 600 
 Microcar Museum: BMW 600 (blue)
 Microcar Museum: BMW 600 (yellow)
 BMW 600 Yahoo Group 

600
Rear-engined vehicles
Cars powered by boxer engines
Cars introduced in 1957
Microcars
Cars powered by 2-cylinder engines